Victor Manuel Oquendo (born July 10, 1979), who goes by the stage name Liquid, is an American Christian hip hop musician and Christian R&B recording artist. His only album, Tales from the Badlands, was released by Gotee Records, in 2005.

Early life
Liquid was born Victor Manuel Oquendo, on July 10, 1979, in Philadelphia, Pennsylvania. He started rapping in the 1990s, when he came up with the stage name Liquid.

Music career
His music recording career commenced in 2005, with the album, Tales from the Badlands, and it was released by Gotee Records on December 26, 2005 with a re-release on July 18, 2006. The album was reviewed by CCM Magazine, Christianity Today, Cross Rhythms, Jesus Freak Hideout, and The Phantom Tollbooth.

Personal life
He met his wife, in Los Angeles, California, whose Bridget Oquendo, and together they reside in Nashville, Tennessee.

Discography
Studio albums
 Tales from the Badlands (released, December 26, 2005, re-released, July 18, 2006, Gotee)

References

1979 births
Living people
20th-century American rappers
American performers of Christian music
Musicians from Nashville, Tennessee
Performers of Christian hip hop music
Rappers from Philadelphia
Rappers from Tennessee
Songwriters from Pennsylvania
Songwriters from Tennessee
21st-century American rappers